Cycas collina is a species of cycad. It is found in the Mai Sơn area of Sơn La Province, Vietnam and in Sipsongpanna, Yunnan, China. It may also exist in Laos and Myanmar.

References

collina
Plants described in 2004